St. Peter-Pagig is a former municipality in the district of Plessur in the Grisons, Switzerland. It was formed on 1 January 2008 through the merger of St. Peter and Pagig.  On 1 January 2013 the former municipalities of St. Peter-Pagig, Calfreisen, Castiel, Langwies, Lüen, Molinis and Peist merged into the municipality of Arosa.

Geography

The former municipality is located in the Schanfigg sub-district of the Plessur district on the northern side of the mid-Schanfigg valley.

On the border with the municipality of Molinis is the Sankt Peter-Molinis railway station, on the Chur-Arosa railway line.

Demographics
St. Peter-Pagig had a population (as of 2010) of 214.

St. Peter had a population of 241.
The historical population is given in the following table:

References

External links

Arosa
Former municipalities of Graubünden